Liu Gaoyang is a Chinese table tennis player.

Liu represented China at the 2014 Summer Youth Olympic Games in Nanjing, winning Gold in the Women's Singles and Mixed Team events.

References

Chinese female table tennis players
Table tennis players at the 2014 Summer Youth Olympics
Year of birth missing (living people)
Living people
People from Dongying
Table tennis players from Shandong
Youth Olympic gold medalists for China
21st-century Chinese women